Sooper Se Ooper is a 2013 Hindi film written & directed by Shekhar Ghosh, cinematography by Mohana Krishna under the banner of Reliance Entertainment and Jigsaw Pictures Pvt. Ltd. The trailer of this movie was released on 27 September and the movie on 25 October 2013. The movie was a total washout.

Cast
 Vir Das as Ranvir
 Kirti Kulhari as Gulabo 
 Gulshan Grover as Madho Singh Rathod
 Deepak Dobriyal as Kukreja
 Yashpal Sharma as Bhairu
 Mohan Kapoor as Lal
 Datta Sonawane
 Vinod Nahardih as Tyagi Don
 Tinnu Anand as Salim Bhai

Plot
Ranvir's fortune is in dumps and selling his ancestral land in Mumbai is the only way to survive. Kukreja, who has put everything at stake, has to get this land to stay away from the wrath of a 'bhai' and also achieve his dream of becoming a builder eventually! For both Ranvir & Kukreja, this plot of land means everything and has to be got any which way. But the key to the land is Ranvir's mama Madho Singh Rathore, in Mandawa, Jhunjhunu. Since the will wasn't made in Ranvir's name, Mama has to give the NOC. Ranvir has to get his Mama to Mumbai within a month & Kukreja has to stop him from reaching Mumbai. We see the transformation of our protagonist Ranvir from a materialistic city youth to someone who is all for family & values & antagonist Kukreja from a 'dalla' to a gangster through this journey, which has some real & funny characters as well. In the 1st half the city goes to a village and in the 2nd the village comes to the city.

Filming
Vir Das was spotted in Jaipur, Rajasthan shooting for Sooper Se Ooper. After shooting in Mandawa, a small town near Jaipur for ten days, the cast and crew went to Jaipur to shoot at the airport. The scenes were shot in [Mandawa had actors Deepak Dobriyal & Gulshan Grover along with Kirti Kulhari, Yashpal Sharma. But the airport scene shot in Jaipur only had Vir Das. Das will be seen in two different avatars in the film – one in jeans-shirt, and the other sporting a dhoti and a pagadi with moustache. While shooting in Mandawa, Das had to sit on top of the camel for most of the scenes.

Kirti Kulhari will be portraying the role of a Rajasthani girl, Gulabo, the queen of Kalbeliya. She also had to sit atop camel carts. She will be seen wearing salwar-kameez and lehenga-choli in the movie.

Sooper Se Ooper stars Gulshan Grover as a don. Grover plays a London-based don who returns to his home town in Rajasthan where Deepak Dobriyal and Yashpal Sharma join as his accomplices. Das's love interest is Grover's daughter.

Music

The music of the film was composed by the first time composer, singer Sonu Nigam and tabla player/percussionist Bickram Ghosh. The composer duo has also teamed up for two other film projects.

Sonu Nigam and Bickram Ghosh] have composed six songs for the film and made a very interesting and fresh album.

References

External links
 

Films set in Mumbai
Films set in Kerala
2013 films
Reliance Entertainment films
Films scored by Bickram Ghosh
Films scored by Sonu Nigam
2010s Hindi-language films